Chuginadak Island is the largest island in the Islands of Four Mountains subgroup of the Aleutian archipelago. Chuginadak is an Aleutian name published by Captain Tebenkov in an 1852 map. According to Knut Bergsland's Aleut Dictionary, the Aleutian word "chugida-lix" means "to fry, to make sizzle." The Western half of the island is called Chuginadax in Aleut, meaning 'simmering'.

These halves of landmasses are connected with a small strip of land. 

The only major geographical place is Applegate Cove (2.5 miles across) (Chuguuĝix̂) on the Northern coast. The cove was named for Samuel Applegate, USC&GS, who commanded the schooner Nellie Juan during a survey of this area in the 1880s.

References

Islands of Four Mountains
Islands of Alaska
Islands of Unorganized Borough, Alaska
Islands of Aleutians West Census Area, Alaska
Uninhabited islands of Alaska